Tutova may refer to:

 Tutova, Vaslui, a commune in Vaslui County, Romania
 Tutova County, a former subdivision of Romania
 Tutova (river), a tributary of the Bârlad in Vaslui County, Romania
 Tutova (magazine), published in Bârlad, Romania